Munnavalkottai is a village in the Needamangalam taluk of Thiruvarur district in the Indian state of Tamil Nadu.

Geography
It is situated about 7 Kilometers West of Needamangalam, 19 Kilometers North of Mannargudi, 31 Kilometers South of Kumbakonam, 31 Kilometers East of Thanjavur and 36 Kilometers West of Tiruvarur.
Munnavalkottai is in the border of the Thiruvarur District and Thanjavur District and has a Branch Post office  with Sub Post office in Kovilvenni. Munnavalkottai is surrounded by Koradacherry Taluk towards East , Ammapettai Taluk towards west , Kodavasal Taluk towards North , Mannargudi Taluk towards South.

Demographics
In the 2011 India census, Munnavalkottai had a population of 947. Males constituted 48% of the population and females 52%. Munnavalkottai had an average literacy rate of 72%: male literacy was 79%, and female literacy was 65%. In 2011 in Munnavalkottai, 10% of the population was under 6 years of age.

Schools
 Government Higher Secondary School, Munnavalkottai
 Government Elementary School, Munnavalkottai

Temples
 Kalahastheeswarar temple located right at the North gate of the Village.
 Olaikonda Ayyanar temple

Politics
Munnavalkottai belongs to Mannargudi (State Assembly Constituency)  is part of Thanjavur (Lok Sabha constituency).

References

Villages in Tiruvarur district

6.Munnavalkottai water way map